Salty Dog  may refer to:

 Salty dog (cocktail), a drink made with vodka or gin and grapefruit juice
 Salty dog (slang), a slang phrase with several meanings, including "an experienced sailor"

Music
 A Salty Dog, a 1969 album by the band Procol Harum
 "A Salty Dog" (song), a song from the album
 "Salty Dog", a song from a 1964 album "Back in Town" by The Kingston Trio
 "Salty Dog", a 2000 song by Flogging Molly
Salty Dog (band), an American hard rock band formed in 1986
 "Salty Dog Blues", a traditional folk song
 "Salty Dog Rag", a 1952 hit by Red Foley

Other uses
The Original Salty Dogs Jazz Band, a jazz ensemble from the Midwestern United States
Syracuse Salty Dogs, a soccer team from Syracuse, New York
VX-23, a U.S. Navy squadron known by the nickname Salty Dogs
 Salty Dog, a character on Lily's Driftwood Bay